Adenocritonia is a genus of flowering plants in the family Asteraceae described as a genus in 1976.

The genus is native to Mesoamerica and the West Indies.

Species
 Adenocritonia adamsii R.M.King & H.Rob. - Jamaica
 Adenocritonia heathiae (B.L.Turner) R.M.King & H.Rob. - Chiapas
 Adenocritonia steyermarkii H.Rob.  - Guatemala

References

Eupatorieae
Asteraceae genera